Young Investment Group (YIG) is a private company established in 1998 in Burma employing more than 6000 local workers and operating 16 subsidiaries in Myanmar, China and Singapore.

YIG Business Sectors

The conglomerate is involved in business sectors in Myanmar ranging from trading and automobile to insurance and micro-finance

The business sectors are:

 Insurance: YIG conduct its insurance business via Young Insurance Global Co. Ltd. (license entity Great Future International Insurance Co) . It is one of the 12 companies in Myanmar that is awarded the insurance license by the government
 Finance: YIG is also one of the companies in the country to be awarded a finance license by the Burma Government. The company engage in SME financing and also have a separate entity providing Micro-financing
 IT & Telecom: YIG telecom division provide site survey and installation. It is also involved in the country's BTS deployment projects
 Energy: YIG have an oil and gas exploration division handling E&P, Surveying and Logistics, and a Hydro Power division which is involved in the Myitha and Yazagyo Hydropower projects.  On 10 Oct 2013, the Myanmar Ministry of Energy announced that YIG Joint venture company, Pacific Hunt Energy Corp, won 2 key PSC blocks in Indaw-Yenan and Taungoo-Pyinmana area. Other winners of the other blocks include other key energy players such as Eni and Petronas Carigali
Automobile: Established since 2002, YIG automobile division Young's Auto is one of the earliest and major car importer of Myanmar
 Trading: The trading arm of YIG handles the import of heavy machinery, construction materials and automobiles and the export of manufactured goods
 Mining: YIG mining companies are one of the major companies in Burma involved in rubies and jade mining. In addition to precious gems mining, the company has also mine gold and minerals
 Manufacturing: YIG has factories producing manufactured goods. It also have Gin factories in the Magway and Mandalay regions
 Construction: The company construction arm is involved in real estate development, infrastructure, housing and factory construction
 TV broadcasting: YTV free to air channel

References

Conglomerate companies of Myanmar
Holding companies established in 1998
1998 establishments in Myanmar